Croc is a video game series developed by Argonaut Software and published by Fox Interactive. It consists of two main games, plus three mobile games. A third main game was proposed but cancelled as Argonaut was "going through a rough patch", and an animated TV series based on the video game series was proposed by Fox Interactive but never came into fruition.

Games

Main series

Croc: Legend of the Gobbos (1997)

Croc: Legend of the Gobbos was developed by Argonaut and published by Fox Interactive for the PlayStation, Sega Saturn and Microsoft Windows in 1997. It was also published in Japan by Mitsui MediaQuest for the PlayStation and Sega Saturn as Croc! Pau Pau Island.

The game tells the tale of Croc, an orphan crocodile who is found and raised by a race of furry creatures known as Gobbos. The evil Baron Dante and his henchmen, the Dantinis, take over the Gobbo Archipelago after kidnapping the Gobbos, including their leader, King Rufus, who saves Croc from the Baron's clutches by summoning Beanie the Bird just in time. Croc must rescue the Gobbos and defeat Baron Dante.

The game was originally conceived as a 3D platform game starring Yoshi from the Super Mario series, titled Yoshi Racing. The prototype was later rejected by Nintendo as they were developing Super Mario 64 at the time, but soon was believed to have influenced the game.

Croc 2 (1999)

Croc 2 is the sequel to the above game, also developed by Argonaut, and published by Fox Interactive for the PlayStation in 1999 and Microsoft Windows the following year. It was also published in Japan by Koei for the PlayStation as Croc Adventure.

Croc finds a message in a bottle, from two crocodiles looking for their son. King Rufus reads the message and believes that the senders are Croc's parents; thus, the Gobbos decide to help Croc find them by catapulting him to the Mainland. However, Croc will also have to defeat Baron Dante again and rescue Professor Gobbo, as the Dantinis have kidnapped him shortly after resurrecting the Baron.

Handheld series

Croc (2000)

Croc is an alternative telling of Croc: Legend of the Gobbos. It was developed by Virtucraft and published by THQ for the Game Boy Color in 2000.

Unlike the original game, this version is a 2D platform game.

Croc 2 (2001)
Croc 2 for the Game Boy Color is an alternative telling of the sequel, similar to its predecessor. It was developed by Natsume and published by THQ in 2001.

The game plays from a top-down perspective and involves platforming, action-adventure, and puzzle solving.

Croc Mobile series

Croc Mobile: Jungle Rumble! (2005)
Croc Mobile: Jungle Rumble! was developed and published by Morpheme for mobile phones in October 2005. It was the first game in the Croc Mobile series to be released.

The game is an isometric platformer with a simple story of Baron Dante returning and Croc having to save the day.

Croc Mobile: Pinball (2006)
Croc Mobile: Pinball was developed and published by Morpheme for mobile phones in 2006. It was the second game in the Croc Mobile series to be released.

It is a simple pinball game featuring Croc characters on the board.

Croc Mobile: Volcanic Panic! (2006)
Croc Mobile: Volcanic Panic! was developed and published by Morpheme for mobile phones in 2006. It was the third and final game in the Croc Mobile series to be released.

Like Croc Mobile: Jungle Rumble!, the game is an isometric platformer with a simple story of Baron Dante returning and Croc having to save the day. This time, Baron Dante disrupts the wedding of King Rufus and Princess Tara by kidnapping the latter and the guests. Croc must rescue them to put the wedding back in action.

Cancelled projects

There was to be a third main game in the series, aptly titled Croc 3, in which Croc, after returning to his family, would train other crocodiles for them to live their own adventures. It was to be an online multiplayer game on the original Xbox. However, it was cancelled as Argonaut was "going through a rough patch".

Fox Interactive planned to make an animated TV series based on the video game series, but it never came into fruition.

References

 
Video game franchises
Video game franchises introduced in 1997
Video games set on fictional islands
Action-adventure games
Argonaut Games games
Fox Interactive games